Zhou Shengtao (born April 1944) is a Chinese politician who served as party branch secretary of the  from 2002 to 2007. He was a member of the 14th CCP Central Commission for Discipline Inspection. He was an alternate member of the 15th Central Committee of the Chinese Communist Party and a member of the 16th Central Committee of the Chinese Communist Party. He was a member of the Standing Committee of the 11th National People's Congress.

Biography
Zhou was born in Dongtai County, Jiangsu, in April 1944. He secondary studied at Anfeng High School. In 1962, he entered Nanjing Normal University, majoring in mathematics. He joined the Chinese Communist Party (CCP) in May 1966, when he was about to graduate. 

After University in 1967, he was assigned to the Xinjiang Production and Construction Corps, where he was eventually elevated to secretary of its Discipline Inspection Commission in April 1987. He was appointed secretary of Discipline Inspection Commission of CCP Xinjiang Uygur Autonomous Regional Committee in March 1991 and was admitted to member of the Standing Committee of the CCP Xinjiang Uygur Autonomous Regional Committee, the region's top authority. He was made deputy party secretary of Xinjiang in February 1996, concurrently serving as secretary of the Xinjiang Uygur Autonomous Regional Political and Legal Affairs Commission since April 1998.

He also served as executive deputy director of the Council between February 2003 and March 2010. In March 2008, he was chosen as vice chairperson of the National People's Congress Ethnic Affairs Committee, serving in the post until his retirement in March 2013.

References

1944 births
Living people
People from Dongtai
Nanjing Normal University alumni
People's Republic of China politicians from Jiangsu
Chinese Communist Party politicians from Jiangsu
Alternate members of the 15th Central Committee of the Chinese Communist Party
Members of the 16th Central Committee of the Chinese Communist Party
Members of the Standing Committee of the 11th National People's Congress